The Battle of Juba of 2016 was a series of clashes in South Sudan capital of Juba between rival factions of the Sudan People's Liberation Army (SPLA) loyal to President Salva Kiir and Vice-President Riek Machar respectively.

Background
In August 2015, both sides signed a peace agreement to end the South Sudanese Civil War. Machar was later reappointed as Vice-President in April 2016. At least 1,400 soldiers loyal to Machar moved into Juba before he returned, setting up a camp near the barracks of Kiir-loyal troops. Both sides were deeply suspicious of each other. On 3 July, a soldier loyal to Machar, Lt.Colonel George Gismala  was killed by government security personnel. The killing led to a rise in tensions within some security forces in Juba.

Battle
The fighting started with an incident on 7 July, as soldiers loyal to Machar were stopped at a checkpoint in Juba's Gudele district. Violence erupted, reportedly initiated by government soldiers. The incident left five Kiir-loyalist soldiers dead and two soldiers of unspecified affiliation injured. In the following night, government troops attacked armored cars belonging to United States diplomats, though nobody was hurt.

On 8 July, Kiir and Machar met in the presidential palace for a press conference, attempting to defuse the situation. As the two talked to journalists, Machar's bodyguards parked their cars next to those of Kiir's Presidential Guard (known as "Tiger Battalion"). After a short time, both sides started shooting each other. It remained unclear who started, as both sides would later blame each other; in any case, both Machar and Kiir loyalists were eager for a fight. Chaos erupted, and Kiir personally saved Machar from death. As the fighting temporarily abated, the President brought his rival to a car, shielding him with his own body and ensuring that he could escape. Journalist Peter Martell argued that this action was probably not motivated by any sympathy of Kiir for Machar, but the former's belief that it would reflect badly on him if his rival were to be killed at the presidential palace. The clashes subsequently spread across the city. The army barracks erupted in violence. Shooting occurred outside a UN base, where one death was reported. Government loyalist forces poured into Juba, eventually securing most of it. Fighting on 8 July left 35 SPLM-IO soldiers and 80 government soldiers dead.

The next day was mostly calm, but Kiir ordered his troops to finally hunt down and kill Machar on 10 July. Fighting was concentrated in Jebel and Gudele, where rebel bases were located, as well as in a UN base. Loud explosions and gunfire were also heard near the airport. The government troops used tanks to break through the defenses of Machar's personal compound, forcing him to flee on foot. The South Sudan Air Force's fighter jets and attack helicopters indiscriminately attacked rebel forces, uncaring of civilian casualties. In Jebel, rebel camps were bombed by government helicopters. Two Chinese peacekeepers were killed and 8 others were wounded, when their armoured personnel carrier was hit by a bomb inside the U.N. base. The government soldiers also attacked civilians based on ethnicity, resulting in thousands fleeing for their lives. The fighting initially ended when a thunderstorm began. At least 272 people, including 33 civilians, were killed during the fighting on 8 July.

The battle resumed on 11 July, and Gudele and Jebel remained hotspots of violence. Explosions hit Tomping, where the airport, embassies, and a U.N. base are located. Mortars were heard in the downtown area. Eight people in a UN refugee camp were killed and 67 were injured from gunfire. A ceasefire was announced; however, reports of gunfire continued. By the morning of 12 July, it appeared that the ceasefire was holding. Regardless, government troops including Mathiang Anyoor militiamen continued to loot the city.

Approximately 50 to 100 soldiers looted the Terrain Hotel, where they proceeded to murder journalist John Gatluak  and rape five women. 10 soldiers were sentenced to jail for the crimes in August 2018.

Even days after the battle had ended, soldiers were stopping women venturing out of civilian camps to steal from and rape them. Human Rights Watch commented that had UN peacekeepers had patrolled "key areas", fewer rapes would have occurred. On 4 August, OHCHR stated that there had been more than 200 reported cases of sexual assault in Juba. The HRW also noted that the UNMISS peacekeepers at Thongpiny base took more than six hours to let fleeing civilians in. During and after the battle, government forces blocked fleeing civilians, and a journalist who had written a critical editorial on the clashes was detained.

Aftermath

Overall at least 300 people were killed in the fighting, including at least 33 civilians and 2 Chinese U.N. peacekeepers. 11 Ugandans were also among the dead. Approximately 36,000 civilians fled parts of the city due to the clashes. Many stores had been looted during the conflict.

There were around 600 Indians in South Sudan; around 450 in Juba and others elsewhere in the country at the time of conflict. Two C-17 Globemasters of the Indian Air Force were deployed to evacuate Indians and other foreign nationals. The first flight left Juba on 15 July (South Sudan Time) carrying 143 individuals including 10 women and 3 infants. It landed in Kerala on 16 July. The operation was codenamed Operation Sankat Mochan (lit. Saviour).

On 12 August, the UN Security Council authorized a new Regional Protection Force mandated to protect Juba Airport as well as other installations as a part of UNMISS.

With the collapse of the peace deal, the civil war fully resumed and further escalated in violence.

Reactions
Both Kiir and Machar have condemned the clashes, and repeatedly called for their forces to stop fighting.

 Ban Ki-Moon: "I am shocked and appalled by the heavy fighting that is currently taking place in Juba. I strongly urge President Kiir and First Vice-President Riek Machar to do everything within their power to de-escalate the hostilities immediately and to order their respective forces to disengage and withdraw to their bases. This senseless violence is unacceptable and has the potential of reversing the progress made so far in the peace process..."

 The UNSC, after an emergency meeting on the crisis, issued a statement calling for an immediate cessation to the fighting and for both Kiir and Machar to do their utmost to control their respective forces. The United Nations Mission in South Sudan has increased patrols near its base.

National reactions
 condemned the conflict, and the Sudanese President Omar al-Bashir urged Kiir and Machar in telephone calls to use self-restraint.

 The United States condemned the violence and called for the parties to "immediately restrain their forces from further fighting, return them to barracks, and prevent additional violence and bloodshed."

References

Works Cited 

2016 in South Sudan
Conflicts in 2016
Juba
South Sudanese Civil War